XEAW-AM is a radio station located in Monterrey, Nuevo León, Mexico, with 10,000 Watts, owned and operated by Multimedios Radio and currently simulcasts XHAW-FM's La Gran AW romantic format. The station also transmits the Telediario newscasts from co-owned Multimedios Televisión. XEAW-AM broadcasts on a frequency of 1280 kHz.

History
The XEAW-AM callsign first appeared on a border-blaster radio station located in Reynosa, Tamaulipas, across the Rio Grande (Río Bravo) from McAllen, Texas, USA. In the 1930s the station came under the control of Dr. John R. Brinkley who became famous for both his controversial treatments of sexual dysfunction and his operations of XER and XERA at Villa Acuña (modern-day Ciudad Acuña, Coahuila), opposite Del Rio, Texas.

Meanwhile, in Monterrey, XEX-AM on 1310 kHz started up in 1934; in 1937, Jesús Dionisio González (El Heraldo del Comercio, S.A.) bought the station from Don Federico Zertuche. The first transmission over XEX was a baseball game from Mexico City. In the early 1950s, the government requested the XEX callsign to build a national network, and in turn the station received the new callsign XEAW; at the same time, the station moved to 1280 kHz. In 1968, the Estrellas de Oro group expanded to a television station, XHAW-TV channel 12.

See also
Border blaster – a list of super-power radio stations located on the international border of Mexico facing the United States.
Dr. John R. Brinkley – brief biography and history of XER and XERA.

External links
"Wolfman Jack's old station howling once again." – Dallas Times Herald, January 2, 1983. – primarily about XERF but also includes background information on the border-blasters.
Border Radio, by Fowler, Gene and Crawford, Bill.  Texas Monthly Press, Austin. 1987 
Mass Media Moments in the United Kingdom, the USSR and the USA, by Gilder, Eric. – "Lucian Blaga" University of Sibiu Press, Romania. 2003

References

Radio stations in Monterrey
Multimedios Radio